The Beast Within: A Gabriel Knight Mystery (also known as Gabriel Knight 2: The Beast Within) is an interactive movie point-and-click adventure game, developed and published by Sierra On-Line for MS-DOS, Macintosh, and Microsoft Windows, and released in 1995. The live-action scenes star the talents of Dean Erickson and Joanne Takahashi in the game's lead roles. The sequel to 1993's Gabriel Knight: Sins of the Fathers and the second entry in the Gabriel Knight series, the game focuses on the lives of Gabriel Knight, an author who is descended from a family that combats supernatural evils, and Grace Nakimura, a student who assists Gabriel, as they become involved in a new case within Germany that focuses around a werewolf that has begun killing people around the city of Munich, and has connections to the lives of two famous people of Germany's history.

Unlike its predecessor, the game was produced entirely in full-motion video – a technology that was popular at the time for game production but expensive to use. The game's story not only incorporates the mythology of werewolves and the rich history of Bavaria in its plot, but also improved on gameplay, including the involvement of a second playable character for exploration of the story in their perspective. Production on the game included recasting the roles of the main characters, due to the actors that voiced them in the previous title being unsuitable to portray them, and using computer-generated scenery for the location in the game, with filming minimized to two takes, and voice-over recording constrained to a single day due to the production budget.

The Beast Within garnered critical praise for its storytelling and characterization, and has made appearances in numerous "best" lists, but was not a commercial success following its release. Despite this, it spawned a sequel, Gabriel Knight 3: Blood of the Sacred, Blood of the Damned, in 1999.

Gameplay 

The Beast Within is a point-and-click adventure game, played from a third-person perspective; a first-person perspective is used at some points during the game. The story is divided into six chapters that plays out in a linear fashion, all of which is conducted between the two playable characters – half involve Gabriel, and the other half involve Grace. In each chapter, players must complete a set of required actions in order to advance the story, but may do so in a non-linear fashion, and can conduct optional actions that can provide background on the game's story and events. Each chapter features a variety of locations that the player can visit, some of which involve an overhead map which uses a hint system to highlight key locations that have actions to be performed in the chapter. With Sierra games of the time,  a running score is used to keep check on actions, both required and optional, that players have completed (i.e. acquiring an object needed for a puzzle).

In each location, the player can move the cursor to find items to interact with, or places where they can move to another spot or site. Unlike Gabriel Knight: Sins of the Fathers, the cursor is context sensitive, and will conduct an action when the player interacts with something, depending on what the interaction will involve - interacting with a person, for example, will begin a conversation. However, items collected and placed in the character's inventory, which can be examined when selected, need to be made an active item before they can be used on interactive objects. Other options include: access to a main menu to save/load a game, change settings, or quit the current game; a movie section, allowing players to replay movies unlocked during the game; and an option, available until the final chapter, to look back over previous conversations as Gabriel, or review notes made by Grace. Conversations focus on a series of topics, with additional ones becoming available as the player makes progress on the story. In some situations, the player must overcome a dangerous situation or risk occurring a game over moment, forcing them to retry, restart the game, or restore a previous save.

Story

Setting 
The Beast Within takes place within a world where supernatural forces, both good and evil, have existed throughout human history, with any becoming a threat to humanity being combatted by people who specialize in fighting such powers. The story incorporates the mythology of werewolves, and the historical backgrounds of King Ludwig II and Richard Wagner between 1870 and 1886, as well as fictional events surrounding the relationship between the two during this period of Germany's history. Locations used in the game include the city of Munich, the fictional town of Rittersberg, and a number of sites around southern Bavaria, including Neuschwanstein Castle.

Plot 
A year after the "Voodoo Murders" in New Orleans, novelist Gabriel Knight takes over residency of his family's ancestral home in Rittersberg, Germany. While seeking inspiration for a new manuscript, Gabriel finds himself assuming his family's responsibility as a "Schattenjäger" ("shadow hunter") – a role his ancestors have assumed in combatting supernatural evils – when the townsfolk call for his help. Sent to Munich to investigate a spate of killings around the city, he discovers evidence that they are the action of a werewolf, despite the belief by local police, led by commissar Thomas Leber, that they are being committed by two escaped zoo wolves. Discovering the events are linked to a local hunting club, Gabriel seeks entry as a new member. Impressing the club's charismatic leader, Baron Friedrich Von Glower, he is invited to join as a guest, and spends the evening with its members, including Baron Von Zell – a banker who resents his presence.

Meanwhile, Gabriel's assistant Grace Nakimura travels to Rittersberg upon receiving word from him about his new case. Unable to learn where he is, she opts to conduct research on werewolves, searching through the journals of previous Schattenjägers and gaining access to the town's historical records. Her research soon comes across a lead – an immortal alpha werewolf called "The Black Wolf", that terrorised locals during the 18th century. Although it was killed, one of Gabriel's ancestors found it had a son, who assumed the name and continued causing deaths, but died during the 1860s while pursuing it, after discovering it had begun getting close to King Ludwig II. After sending her findings to Gabriel via his family's law firm, she receives instructions from him to investigate Ludwig's connection, while he decides to investigate the club further on belief the Black Wolf is among its members, confiding to her that he recently begun a friendship with Friedrich.

After learning of another killing, Gabriel secures a meeting with Leber to talk about the attacks. Although resenting his presence, the commissar reveals the latest was an accountant, and when questioned on the Black Wolf, Gabriel discovers a link between the killings and several missing person cases across Germany. Investigating the club further, he begins to suspect Von Zell's involvement in the killings, and when invited to an annual hunting trip by Friedrich, Gabriel finds evidence confirming him to be a werewolf. After witnessing him consuming several corpses in a cave, Gabriel reveals his findings to Friedrich, who, horrified of what he learns, agrees to help kill him. However, when the men confront Von Zell in his wolf form, Gabriel is forced to kill him after being bitten when Friedrich hesitates to do the deed. Wounded, Gabriel is sent back to Munich, but slowly discovers that Von Zell has infected him with lycanthropy.

In the meantime, Grace conducts research on Ludwig II, and discovers that not only was his health in decline after 1870, he also developed a strong friendship with musical composer Richard Wagner. After receiving an English transcript of Ludwig's diary, she learns that he came into contact with the Black Wolf, who befriended him during talks in Prussia, and infected him during his hunting trip. Seeking to escape his fate, he and Wagner conducted research on werewolves and learnt that if subjected to a specific acoustic frequency, they could be exposed in their true form. While Ludwig had an opera theatre constructed for this purpose, Wagner composed a new opera that could create the frequency needed for their plan to have the Black Wolf killed. When Wagner died, Ludwig received his score sheets and hid them before his arrest on the grounds of insanity. After tracking down Gabriel, Grace discovers that he has been infected with lycanthropy and brings him back to Rittersberg.

Comparing notes with him, Grace reveals that a title deed request revealed that Friedrich is the Black Wolf. Gabriel confirms this, after realizing that Von Zell was a beta werewolf that Friedrich created but could not kill without suffering the same fate. Realizing he must be killed, Grace works to find Wagner's missing opera and arranges for it to be performed in Munich, inviting Friedrich to attend alongside Leber. Two months later, Grace works to set up the trap, but secures Gabriel in a prop room for his safety. Confiding in him that she has doubts their plan may work, Gabriel angrily breaks free during her absence, and takes the place of one of the performers. As the opera reaches its climax, both he and Friedrich transform and rush into the basement. Once there, Gabriel swiftly forces Friedrich into a boiler room, whereupon he and Grace trap him in an incinerator, burning him alive. A few days later, Gabriel, now cured, mourns the loss of Friedrich and the man he was, and reconciles with Grace by vowing to have her as his partner on future cases.

Cast 
 Dean Erickson - Gabriel Knight
 Joanne Takahashi - Grace Nakimura
 Andrea Martin - Gerde Hull
 Kay E. Kuter - Werner Huber
 Nicholas Worth -  Leber
 Fredrich Solms - Harald Übergrau
 Peter J. Lucas - Baron Friedrich von Glower
 Richard Raynesford - Baron Garr von Zell
 Clement von Franckenstein - von Aigner
 Wolf Muser - Doktor Klingmann
 Bruce Ed Morrow - Mr. Smith
 Judith Drake - Mrs. Smith
 Greg Bennick - Opera juggler/performer
 Brad Greenquist - Georg Immerding
 Michael Wilhelms - Joseph Dallmeier

Development 
The game was released for PC and Macintosh. The Macintosh version uses a video player developed by Sierra instead of an off-the-shelf technology such as QuickTime, and had a tendency to crash or run slowly on 680x0 processors. There is an XP-compatible re-print on DVD with de-interlaced movies, but it is exclusive to the Italian market.

The Beast Within has a much more involved plot than its predecessor, Sins of the Fathers. Jane Jensen said that this was because the FMV graphics "limited the interactivity we could do. I specifically tried to put a lot more intrigue in the plot, so even though the interactivity was easier, there would still be enough meat going on to keep people engaged".

The role of Gabriel Knight was re-cast, since Jensen felt Tim Curry, who voiced Knight in Sins of the Fathers, did not look the part. Dean Erickson took the part, and delivered a take on the character markedly different from Curry's. Erickson explained that "there was no way I was going to do Tim Curry, because... you know, Tim Curry is Tim Curry. He was a little more animated or maybe you could say over the top. What he was doing called for that. What I was doing called for something a little more down to earth and grounded". He clarified that "[Curry] only voiced a character and, due to the nature of animation, voices often need to be more over-the-top, because they have to impart more of everything without the visual aspect of a real, live person on screen".

To prepare for the role, Erickson intensely studied films with Southern characters and voice tapes of Southern dialects in order to make his accent sound natural. He enjoyed the role and later said that if the Gabriel Knight series had continued using live action FMV, he would have done the next five or six.

Filming for the cut scenes was done in California during mid-1995. Erickson recalled that due to video game budget constraints, the actors were expected to show up at the set prepared to give a perfect delivery; director Will Binder would not run more than two takes of any scene unless absolutely necessary. In addition, all of Erickson's narrative voice overs were recorded in a single day at a sound studio.

According to Jensen, The Beast Within badly ran over its "original modest... budget". She summarized:

In Neuschwanstein, the actual paintings in the Singer's Hall were changed to correspond with the plot. The filming for the cut scenes was partly documented in the British series Bad Influence, leading to presenter Violet Berlin having a brief walk-on cameo.

According to Todd Vaughn of PC Gamer US, the original Gabriel Knight was not as successful as Jensen had wanted. However, he noted before The Beast Withins release that "she's hoping the same attention to character development and puzzles, coupled with the new video technology, will satisfy both the hard-core puzzler and reach a broader audience".

Soundtrack 
In every Gabriel Knight game, the popular gospel hymn "When the Saints Go Marching In" can be heard, albeit in different remixes and forms. In The Beast Within it is heard when Gabriel is visiting the Marienplatz in Munich.

As well as creating the soundtrack for the second game alongside Jay Usher, series composer Robert Holmes wrote the music for a scene from the fictional opera entitled "Der Fluch Des Engelhart" ("The Curse of Engelhart").

Reception 

In the United States, The Beast Within was the fourth-best-selling computer game of January 1996, and the 17th-best-selling of the first six months of 1996. The game and its predecessor, Gabriel Knight: Sins of the Fathers, sold a combined total of 300,000 copies by December 1998. Leslie Gornstein of the Orange County Register wrote that these numbers were "considered a success in the world of adventures, according to Jensen". Elsewhere, Jensen expressed frustration with The Beast Withins commercial performance. She wrote that she had expected it to appeal to a large, mainstream audience, and remarked in retrospect, "I thought it would be top ten. And it was - for about a week". Jensen further commented that the game's Christmas Eve launch was a contributing factor to its underperformance.

The game was very well received by critics; at GameRankings it scores 90.50% (based on 6 reviews). William R. Trotter of PC Gamer US wrote that "The Beast Within sets a new standard — within the graphic adventure genre, at any rate — for interactive entertainment". In Computer Gaming World, Johnny L. Wilson similarly declared it "a graphic adventure benchmark".

Critic Philip Jong of Adventure Classic Gaming gave the game 5 out of 5 stars, saying that it "is an epic interactive adventure that triumphs in both gameplay and storytelling. It masterfully blends fantasy and a touch of real life history to add an unparalleled degree of realism to an adventure game. With this title, Sierra On-Line sets the standards for developing strong female leading roles; Jensen should be praised for her development of an intelligent female role model". A Next Generation critic likewise praised the character of Grace, as well as Joanne Takahashi's "appropriately sardonic" performance in the role. He compared the game favorably to Sierra's Phantasmagoria (which uses the same engine), citing the greater amount of gameplay content and better scenery, and rated it one of the overall best graphic adventures due to its "detailed and evolved storyline with an easy to use yet sophisticated graphic system". Maximum commented that "The Beast Within is one of the few [interactive movies] which manage to grasp the attention of the player, largely due to the interesting plot that runs throughout. Graphically the game is pretty smart too, the digitised actors working well with the computer-generated [scenery] on which they're super-imposed".

Awards 
The Beast Within won Computer Gaming Worlds 1995 "Game of the Year" award, and was named the best computer adventure game of 1995 by Computer Games Strategy Plus, and the best of 1996 by GameSpot and PC Gamer US. It also won GameSpot's "Best Story" prize. Hailing it as "one of the best adventure games ever", the editors of PC Gamer US wrote: "If it had been just a movie, The Beast Within would easily beat 99 percent of what passes for horror on the big screen these days". The staff of Computer Gaming World called it "the continuation of a brilliant tradition—the graphic adventure as art".

The Beast Within was a finalist for the Computer Game Developers Conference's 1996 "Best Adventure Game/RPG", "Best Script, Story or Interactive Writing" and "Best Use of Video" Spotlight Awards. However, these prizes went respectively to The Elder Scrolls II: Daggerfall, You Don't Know Jack XL and Wing Commander IV. In 1996, GamesMaster ranked the game 71st on their "Top 100 Games of All Time."

Legacy 
In 1998, The Beast Within was adapted into a novel by Jane Jensen. The novel adaptation of the first game is a straightforward adaptation of the events of the game, an approach which Jane Jensen decided, in retrospect, was not the most successful way of introducing Gabriel Knight to a literary audience. For the second novel she "threw the whole idea of the game away and started again from scratch". Both books are out of print as of 2010. As part of her 2012 Kickstarter campaign to fund a new adventure game, Jensen offered both Gabriel Knight novels as ebooks to backers who pledge $50 or more.

In 1996, Computer Gaming World named The Beast Within the 17th best computer game ever, the highest position for any graphic adventure. The editors declared Jane Jensen as "the interactive Anne Rice". In 1998, PC Gamer US declared it the 27th-best computer game ever released, and the editors wrote that it "edges out the first [game] in pure excitement and graphic splendor". In 2000, Computer Games Strategy Plus named The Beast Within one of the "10 Essential Graphic Adventures", and called it "probably the best video-based adventure game ever released". In 2011, Adventure Gamers named Gabriel Knight 2 the 3rd-best adventure game ever released.

In a 2004 retrospective review, Adventure Gamers''' Dan Ravipinto called The Beast Within "one of the few computer games to actually involve personal, meaningful growth in a player-character. Easily one of the best Full Motion Video games ever made".

Writing for Vice Media in 2021, Jess Morrissette credits the game's writing, acting performances, and queer themes, calling The Beast Within'' a "minor masterpiece in adventure gaming".

References

External links 
 Sierra Entertainment, Inc. page
 
 

1995 video games
DOS games
Adventure games
Point-and-click adventure games
Full motion video based games
Gabriel Knight
Games commercially released with DOSBox
Classic Mac OS games
ScummVM-supported games
Video game sequels
Werewolf video games
Video games developed in the United States
Video games set in 1994
Video games set in Germany
Video games with digitized sprites
Windows games